Hills is an unincorporated community in Lee County on U.S. Highway 290. According to the Handbook of Texas, the community had an estimated population of 20 in 2000.

Public education in the community of Hills is provided by the Giddings Independent School District.

References

External links

Unincorporated communities in Texas
Unincorporated communities in Lee County, Texas